Victor Mercea (2 January 1924 – 29 June 1987) was a Romanian nuclear physicist. His most notable scientific contributions were to the production of heavy water. He authored more than 200 scientific publications. He was the head of the Institute of Isotopic and Molecular Technologies (ITIM, Cluj-Napoca) from 1970 to 1987; Professor of Solid-State Physics, Magnetism and Electronics at Babeș-Bolyai University; Dean of the Faculty of Physics (1981-1984); corresponding member of the Romanian Academy (1963).

References

1924 births
1987 deaths
Scientists from Timișoara
Politehnica University of Timișoara alumni
Romanian nuclear physicists
Academic staff of Babeș-Bolyai University
Corresponding members of the Romanian Academy